Shoes is a 2012 international short film directed, written and produced by Konstantin Fam. The film is the result of a joint effort by professional team from Russia, the USA, the Czech Republic, Poland, France, Belarus and Ukraine. The film is the first novel of the film trilogy "Witnesses" dedicated to the memory of victims of the Holocaust. It was the only nominee from Russia for the Academy Awards in the short film category in 2013.

Plot
The first installment traces the personal history of a Jewish girl in 1930s-1940s from the point of view of a pair of red shoes. Starting from the shop window where the shoes were purchased and ending at a mountain of discarded shoes of the victims in a mass grave of the Auschwitz concentration camp.

Film crew
 Original idea: Dmitry Parshkov (Russia)
 Director: Konstantin Fam (Russia)
 Writer: Konstantin Fam (Russia)
 Composer: Egor Romanenko (Ukraine)
 Actors: Uliana Elina (Czech Republic), Tatiana Spyrgyash (Belarus) - Woman; Ilya Uglava (Czech Republic), Alexander Bokovets (Belarus) - Man
 Producers: Konstantin Fam, Uriy Igrushа, Miсhail Bykov, Alex A. Petruhin, Tanya Dovidovskaya, Krzysztof Wiech,  Tania Rakhmanova, Alexey * Timofeev, Aleksandr Kulikov, Igor Lopatonok
 Cameramen: Asen Shopov (Czech Republic), Sergey Novikov (Belarus), Dzmitry Shulpin (Belarus), Otabek Djuraev (France), Marec Gajczak (Poland)
 Production designer: Philip Lagunovich-Cherepko (Belarus), Jarmila Konecna (Czech Republic)

Art features
The main object in a shot is a pair of the shoes. There are no dialogues in a shot and we see no human faces but only their shoes. The film is accompanied by an original soundtrack inspired by Jewish folk motives.

Cultural effect
In 2013 the Deputy Director of Peter the Great Museum of Anthropology and Ethnography Efim Rezvan on behalf of the Museum presented the film an honorary diploma from "for bright creative contribution to the museum's exhibition program and the preservation of memory".
Together with the Department of Human Rights and the Department of Education Nuremberg plans to create an educational program for school children in Germany.

Accolades

Awards
 Monaco International Film Festival (Monaco), Best Short Film, Best Director, Best Original Music, Best Producer, Best Cinematographer, Angel Peace Award
 Grand Prix Video Festival Imperia (Italy)
 Pitching project was held at the 65th Cannes Film Festival
 The film is invited to a collection of Yad Vashem (Israel) reference number is V-6195
 Radiant Angel Festival (Russia), Best Live Action Short Film Award
 Artkino Festival (Russia), The best experimental film Award
 1st place of the festival "Vstrechi na Vjatke" (Russia, Kirov)
 Special prize magazine "NewMag", the festival "Golden Apricot" (Armenia)
 Festival KONIK (Russia), the prize For the contribution to the short film development in Russia
 Festival KONIK (Russia), the prize For the musical solution
 Opening Film Festival special program in Haifa (Israel)

Participations
 Russian Cinema Week (Israel)
 Doors to Russian Cinema (USA)
 Clermont-Ferrand (France)
 Listapad (Belarus)
 Badalona (Spain)
 Coniminuticontati (Italy)
 Atlanta Jewish Film Festival (USA)
 St. Anne (Russia)
 Kinotaur (Sochi)
 Kinolikbez (Barnaul)
 Kinoshock (Anapa)
 Short (Kaliningrad)
 Konik (Moscow) - Moscow Premiere film closing

Official partners 
 Federation of Jewish Communities of Russia 
 Documentary Film Center
 Youth Center of the Russian Cinema Union
 Roskino
 Belarusian Ministry of Culture.

See also 
 Witnesses (2018 film)
 Brutus (2016 film)
 Violin (2017 film)

References

External links 
 
 

2012 short films
2012 films
Holocaust films
2012 drama films
Russian drama films
2010s Russian-language films
War epic films
Epic films based on actual events
Rescue of Jews during the Holocaust
Russian short films